Avanesyan is an Armenian surname. Notable people with the surname include:
 Arpat Avanesyan, physicist and legislator.
 David Avanesyan (born 1988), Russian boxer.
 Elina Avanesyan (born 2000), Russian tennis player.
 Mher Avanesyan (born 1974), Armenian professional footballer. 
 Mher Avanesyan (born 1981), Armenian double-arm amputee alpine skier and competitive sailor
 Monica Avanesyan (born 1998), Armenian singer.

Armenian-language surnames